Bir Mahali (or Birmahle) is a village in the eastern part of Aleppo Governorate in northern Syria, south of the Syrian Kurdish enclave of Ayn al-Arab and near the town of Sarrin.

The fishing and farming village on the banks of Euphrates is predominantly Arab-populated with some 430 inhabitants.

United States-led airstrike in 2015 
Between 30 April and 1 May 2015, coalition airstrikes led by the United States, said to target ISIL, killed at least 64 civilians: 31 minors, 20 women, and 13 men in the village then populated by some 4000 inhabitants.

The Syrian Observatory for Human Rights described the event as a "massacre" and said the attack on the village constitutes the highest civilian losses from an attack by US and allied Arab forces since the launch of their air campaign against ISIL on September 23, 2014.

A United States Central Command spokesperson commented on 2 May 2015, "We currently have no information to corroborate allegations that coalition airstrikes resulted in civilian casualties. Regardless, we take all allegations seriously and will look into them further."

See also 
 Kunduz hospital airstrike
 Airstrikes on hospitals in Yemen

References 

Populated places in Ayn al-Arab District
Villages in Aleppo Governorate
Attacks in Syria in 2015
2015 in Syria
American airstrikes during the Syrian civil war
2015 controversies
Massacres committed by the United States